South Slavic may refer to:

 South Slavic languages, one of three branches of the Slavic languages
 South Slavs, a subgroup of Slavic peoples who speak the South Slavic languages

Language and nationality disambiguation pages